The Alameda Apartments is a historic apartment building at the northeast corner of 7th Street and Elberon Avenue in Zanesville, Ohio, United States.  Built circa 1910, the building was one of many apartments constructed during Zanesville's industrial and population boom of the early twentieth century. While the architect of the Gothic Revival building is unknown, it was most likely designed by Zanesville architect Harry C. Meyer. The two-story brick building includes a storefront on one corner and first- and second-floor apartments in the rest of its space. Its design features a bell-shaped gable at one corner, two oriel windows topped by small gables, brick corbels throughout, and dormers and brick chimneys projecting from the roof.

The building was listed on the National Register of Historic Places on June 17, 1982.

References 

National Register of Historic Places in Muskingum County, Ohio
Residential buildings completed in 1910
Apartment buildings in Ohio
Residential buildings on the National Register of Historic Places in Ohio
Buildings and structures in Zanesville, Ohio
Gothic Revival architecture in Ohio
Queen Anne architecture in Ohio
1910 establishments in Ohio